Rostam or Rustam is a legendary hero in Persian mythology, the son of Zāl and Rudaba, whose life and work was immortalized by the 10th-century Persian poet Ferdowsi in the Shahnameh, or Epic of Kings, which contains pre-Islamic Iranian folklore and history. However, the roots of the narrative date much earlier.

In the Shahnameh, Rostam and his predecessors are Marzbans of Sistan (present-day Iran and Afghanistan). Rostam is best known for his tragic fight with Esfandiyār, the other legendary Iranian hero; for his expedition to Mazandaran (not to be confused with the modern Mazandaran Province); and for tragically fighting and killing his son, Sohrab, without knowing who his opponent was. He is also known for the story of Seven Labours. Rostam was eventually killed by Shaghad, his half-brother.

Rostam was always represented as the mightiest of Iranian paladins (holy warriors), and the atmosphere of the episodes in which he features is strongly reminiscent of the Parthian Empire. He rode the legendary stallion Rakhsh and wore a special suit named Babr-e Bayan in battles.

Origins
While the narrative of the Shahname is the definitive work on Rostam, Ferdowsi did not invent the character; Rostam stories were popular as far back as the seventh century in Pars and originated much earlier, likely in Eastern Iranian-speaking territories. He famously wears the zīn-i palang or "panther-skin garment":

Background 

In the Shahnameh, Rostam is a native of Zabulistan, a historical region roughly corresponding to today's Zabul Province, southern Afghanistan. His mother Rudaba was a princess of Kabul. Rostam is the champion of champions and is involved in numerous stories, constituting some of the most popular (and arguably some of most masterfully created) parts of the Shahnameh. In Shahnameh, Rostam—like his grandfather Sam—works as both a faithful military general as well as king-maker for the Kayanian dynasty of Persia.

As a young child, he slays the maddened white elephant of the king Manuchehr with just one blow of the mace owned by his grandfather Sam, son of Nariman. He then tames his legendary stallion, Rakhsh.

The etymology of Rostam's name is from Common Iranian "*rautas-taxma-, "'river-strong', i.e. 'as strong as a river', Rostam's mother is Rūdāba "(she) of the River Water", and his father is Zāl, who has white hair.

Birth and early life 
Rostam's mother Rudaba, the princess of Kabul, was known for her peerless beauty, and Rostam's father was Zāl. Zāl was one of Persia's most powerful warriors and a great general who conquered many rebellious tribes and ruled over Zabulistan. Zāl was known for his wisdom and was unparalleled in riding and fighting on horseback. He once demonstrated his skills to Emperor Manuchehr to seek his approval to marry his lover Rudaba.

In Persian mythology, Rudaba's labour in giving birth to Rostam was prolonged due to the extraordinary size of her baby - so much so that Zāl, her lover and husband, felt sure that his wife would die in labour. Rudaba was indeed near death when Zāl decided to summon the Simurgh, which duly appeared and instructed him upon how to perform a Rostamzad, a Caesarean section, thus saving both Rudaba and the child.

After Zāl's father, Sam learned of his grandchild's birth, he rushed to see Rostam and was overjoyed. Rostam was brought up and trained by Zāl in warfare. When Rostam single-handedly slew a mad elephant, his father sent him on his first military assignment.

Rostam's task was to conquer the fortress on the summit of Mt Sipand where his great grandfather, Nariman, once besieged it and was slain in the battle. Rostam breached the fortress, defeated the enemy, ransacked its treasury and reported his success to his father, Zāl and grandfather, Sam.

Haft Khan 

He undertakes a heroic journey to save his sovereign, the over-confident Kay Kāvus who is captured by the Divs of Mazandaran. This journey is called "Rostam's Seven Quests".

There are some similarities between the legends of Rostam and those pertaining to the great Irish hero Cú Chulainn. They both defeat a ferocious beast as a young man, slay their sons in combat ("Rostam and Sohrab", a motif also found in the Hildebrandslied), are virtually invincible in combat, and are murdered by treachery while killing their murderer on their last breath.

Two Persian heroes, Rostam and Esfandiyār, share stories with the Labours of Hercules.

Alternate views 
It is written by the Royal Central Asian Society in the Journal of the Royal Central Asian Society that the struggle between Rostam and the Div-e Sepid "White Demon" represents a struggle between Persians and invaders from the northern Caspian provinces.

Death 

In Shahnameh, the life spans of the heroes who are from the generation of Sam Yale (Rostam's grandfather) are described as being very long, and that of Rostam fits this pattern: he has reached the age of six hundred at the time of his death by violence (dying at the hand of his envious half-brother Shaghad, who kills him by throwing him into a well full of poisoned spears). In this incident, Rostam's faithful steed Rakhsh and the hero's brother, Zavareh are also killed.

Descent and other relations 

With Tahmineh, princess of Samangan, Rostam had a son called Sohrab, who was killed accidentally by his father in the time of Kay Kavus. In Banu Goshasp Nama Rostam later had a daughter called Banu Goshasp, who had a full brother called Faramarz, and both became renowned heroes in Turan and India. Goshasp, through her marriage with Giv had a son, Bijan.

Rostam had also a half brother called Shaghad, who was always jealous of him and provoked his death.

Just as famous as Rostam was his horse Rakhsh, which had an incredibly long life like Rostam, due to divine protection, and died at the same time as Rostam.

Historical basis 
Ernst Herzfeld maintained that the dynasty of Gondophares represented the House of Suren, highest of the five premier families of Parthian Empire, invested with the hereditary right of commanding the royal armies, and placing the crown on the king's head at the coronation. Probably when around 129 BCE, nomad peoples, especially the Indo-Scythians (Sacaraucae, Old Persian Sakaravaka "nomadic Saka” or Saraucae) and the Tocharians attacked the eastern frontier of Parthia, defense was entrusted by the Parthian emperors to the Surens; and the latter eventually not only repelled the Indo-Scythians, but pursued them into Arachosia and the Punjab, this event probably representing interitus Saraucarum ( the perishing of the Sacaraucae) of Gnaeus Pompeius Trogus (Prologue 42).

Echoes of these events are preserved in the legends of the Sistān cycle, partly incorporated in the Shahnameh, but once also surviving as independent epics, such as the Garšāspnāma mentioned in the Tārikh-e Sistān, and the Ketāb al-Sakisarān cited by al-Masudi. These related the deeds of the hero Garshasp and his descendants, Narimān, Sām, Zāl or Dastān, and above all of the latter's son Rostam. It is difficult to relate the Indo-Parthian names known from coins and history to those of the epic, which are possibly honorific titles, since a recently reported silver coin describes Gondophares (spelt in Greek script Hyndopharres) as surnamed Sām. A single ruler may of course have received more than one such title, and the historical names may be repeated in succeeding generations.

Family tree

Gallery 
Mughal era manuscripts depicting Rostam's seven labours and other feats:

See also 
 Shahnameh
 List of Shahnameh characters
 Rostam and Sohrab
Battle of Rostam and Esfandiyār
 Rostam and Shaghad
 Rostam's Seven Labours
 Zal and Rudabeh
 Garshaspname
 Banu Goshasp
 Naqsh-e Rostam
 Rostami (place)
 Rostami (surname)
 The Knight in the Panther's Skin
 Nadr ibn al-Harith - Contemporary of Muhammad, told stories about Rostam and Esfandiyar.

References

Sources

External links 

 Shahnameh, by Hakim Abol-Qasem Ferdowsi Tusi, the complete work (64 Epics), in Persian (ParsTech). This work can be freely downloaded (File size, compiled in the form of an HTML help file: 1.4 MB).
 Iraj Bashiri, Characters of Ferdowsi's Shahnameh, Iran Chamber Society, 2003.
 Shahnameh, English translation by Helen Zimmern.
 Shahnameh. Helen Zimmern translation.
 Shahnameh, Arthur and Edmond Warner translation.
 New Translation of 'Persian Book of Kings' - March, 2006 from NPR, and "The Epic of Iran" - April, 2006, from The New York Times. Also, on 14 May 2006, Washington Post Pulitzer Prize winning book critic Michael Dirda reviewed Dick Davis's translation "Shahnameh: The Persian Book of Kings" "This marvelous translation of an ancient Persian classic brings these stories alive for a new audience".

 Persian sources
 Complete Persian text
 Shahnameh website

Kayanians
Legendary Iranian people
Heroes in mythology and legend
Shahnameh characters
National personifications